is a Japanese writer of genre fiction. She has won the Shōsetsu Subaru Literary Prize for Newcomers, the Yamamoto Shūgorō Prize, the Naoki Prize, the Shibata Renzaburo Prize, a MEXT Award, and the Chuo Koron Literary Prize. Several of her works have been adapted for television.

Early life and education 

Setsuko Shinoda was born in 1955 in Tokyo. As a child she read manga by Sanpei Shirato as well as books by foreign authors such as L. Frank Baum, Arthur Conan Doyle, and Mark Twain, and aspired to become a manga artist. She graduated from Tokyo Gakugei University. Before beginning her writing career she worked as a municipal employee in Hachiōji, including working at City Hall and the municipal library. She began taking writing lessons at the Asahi Cultural Center intending to move into public relations, but ended up taking novel writing classes and writing her first novel.

Writing career 

In 1990 Shinoda's debut novel , a science fiction story about a biotech disaster that creates a monster and the social panic that follows, won the 3rd Shōsetsu Subaru Literary Prize for Newcomers. It was subsequently published in book form by Shueisha.

Seven years later, Shinoda won both the Yamamoto Shūgorō Prize and the Naoki Prize, but for different works. Shinoda's collection , published in 1996 by Futabasha, won the 10th Yamamoto Shūgorō Prize. The title novella  combines multiple genres in a story about a woman from Nepal whose arranged marriage to a Japanese farmer leads to confrontations with her husband's mother, her own elevation as an object of religious worship, her husband's subsequent financial ruin, and ultimately a new life in Nepal with more personal freedom but much worse conditions. Science fiction critic Mari Kotani has described Gosaintan as a story that "reexamines the true nature of romance" but also "openly exposes Japan's stance toward Nepal".

A few months later, Shinoda's book , published by Shueisha, won the 117th Naoki Prize. Onnatachi no jihādo follows the individual stories of five women employees experiencing harassment at an  insurance company, focusing on the difficulties they have in a male-dominated society. In 1998 the book was adapted for television by NHK as a 2-episode special titled . 

After her Naoki Prize success, several more of Shinoda's works were adapted for television. In 1998 Shinoda's story , a horror story about a cellist whose attempts to help a girl with a brain disease communicate through music lead to her falling in love with him and using previously unknown paranormal powers to hurt other people in his life, was published as a book and adapted by Nippon TV into a television drama starring Koichi Domoto, Miki Nakatani, and Akiko Yada. Her 2000 novel , about the problems experienced by a married couple with vastly different personal incomes, was adapted into a 2003 NHK drama. Her 1995 horror novel , about a pandemic that strikes a town outside Tokyo, was adapted into a 2006 Nippon TV special program.

Shinoda's 2-volume work  was published by Shinchosha in 2008. Kasō girei tells the story of two men who start to write a role-playing game, decide instead to use the game as the basis for a new religious movement, gain enough adherents to achieve financial success, then find themselves displaced from the religious organization by women followers. In 2009 Kasō girei received the 22nd Shibata Renzaburo Prize. Two years later Shinoda received the 61st MEXT Award in the Literature category from the Japanese government's Agency for Cultural Affairs for her collection .

In 2014 Kadokawa published Shinoda's novel , the story of a Japanese businessman whose efforts to import special crystals needed for electronics manufacturing lead him to a small village in India, where he becomes involved with a local prostitute with exceptional cognitive powers, discovers a scheme to control uranium deposits, and almost dies in an anti-government uprising. Shinoda visited small Indian villages for details of setting and character, but based the fictitious Indian crystal trade in the novel on Japan's trade with Brazil and Australia. The book won the 10th Chuo Koron Literary Prize.

An English version of her story "The Long-rumored Food Crisis", which The Japan Times called "a chilling account of moral breakdown after the Big One levels Tokyo", was published in the 2015 collection Hanzai Japan.

Recognition and honors 
 1990: 3rd Shōsetsu Subaru Literary Prize for Newcomers
 1997: 10th Yamamoto Shūgorō Prize
 1997: 117th Naoki Prize (1997上)
 2009: 22nd Shibata Renzaburo Prize
 2011: 61st MEXT Award in Literature
 2015: 10th Chuo Koron Literary Prize

 2020:

Television adaptations
 1998: , NHK adaptation of Onnatachi no jihādo
 1998: , Nippon TV
 2003: , NHK
 2006: , Nippon TV adaptation of Natsu no saiyaku

Bibliography

Selected works in Japanese 
 , Shueisha, 1991, 
 , Mainichi Shimbun, 1995, 
 , Futabasha, 1996, 
 , Shueisha, 1997, 
 , Magajinhausu, 1998, 
 , 2000, Asahi Shimbun, 
 , Shinchosha, 2008,  (vol. 1),  (vol. 2)
 , Kobunsha, 2010, 
 , Kadokawa, 2014,

Selected work in English translation 
 "The Long-rumored Food Crisis", translated by Jim Hubbert, Hanzai Japan, 2015

References

Living people
1955 births
20th-century Japanese novelists
20th-century Japanese women writers
21st-century Japanese novelists
21st-century Japanese women writers
Japanese women novelists
Japanese science fiction writers
Naoki Prize winners
Writers from Tokyo